Spot Welders is a film and television editorial house.  Spot Welders was established in Venice, California in 1993 by editor Robert Duffy and producer David Glean.

Works
Spot Welders' credits include award-winning music videos and commercials as well as feature films. In addition to Duffy and Glean, Spot Welders partners include Michael Heldman and Haines Hall.   Much of Spot Welders' early reputation arose from its extensive involvement in music videos. The company and its editors earned numerous awards for music videos and commercials.  Spot Welders Ameriquest Concert spot was nominated for an Emmy, and was awarded a Silver Lion at Cannes and a gold award at The One Show.  Duffy, who had already received several awards and nominations as a freelance editor, continued to create award-winning work at Spot Welders.

In 1994, he was recognized by the National Academy of Recording Arts & Sciences (NARAS) for his editing on the Rolling Stones’ Grammy Award-winning “Love Is Strong”, which received the organization’s award for Best Music Video, Short Form in 1994. He was 1995 Finalist for Best Editor for Madonna’s “Take a Bow” music video.

Notable music video projects include: 
"Losing My Religion", R.E.M. (1991)
Grammy Award for Best Short Form Music Video, 1992. 
MTV Video Music Awards 1991, Best Editing. Robert Duffy, Editor
"Man on the Moon", R.E.M. (1993)
MTV Video Music Awards 1993, Best Editing, nominated. Robert Duffy, Editor
"Love Is Strong", Rolling Stones (1994)
Grammy Award for Best Short Form Music Video, 1995. 
"Scream", Michael Jackson and Janet Jackson(1995) 
Grammy Award for Best Short Form Music Video, 1996.
MTV Video Music Awards 1995, Best Editing, nominated. Robert Duffy, Editor 
MVPA Awards 1996, Best Editing in a Music Video. Robert Duffy, Editor 
"99 Problems", Jay-Z (2004)
MTV Video Music Awards 2004, Best Editing. Robert Duffy, Editor
"Freak on a Leash", Korn (1999)
MTV Video Music Awards 1999, Best Editing. Haines Hall, Editor
John Mellencamp “Just Another Day”
Paul Oakenfold “Ready Steady Go”
Counting Crows “A Long December”
The Wallflowers “Sleepwalker”
Madonna "What It Feels Like for a Girl"

Notable commercial projects include:
Calvin Klein "Escape"
Gatorade  "Big Head"
Acura "Dance"
Old Spice "Hungry Like the Bruce"
Verizon "Glory"
Drakkar Noir "Rock Star"

In addition to commercials and music video projects, Spot Welders has worked on various feature films, including:
The Cell
The Fall
The House of Yes
How to Kill Your Neighbor's Dog
Little Miss Sunshine
Slums of Beverly Hills
Spanking the Monkey
Thumbsucker (2005) Director: Mike Mills
Of All the Things (2008) Jody Lambert, Documentary
Sleepwalkers (2007) Doug Aitken, Series of Art Films
Paperboys (2001) Director Mike Mills
Southlander (2001) Director Steve Hanft
Deformer (2000) Director: Mike Mills Documentary

Facilities
Spot Welders has received recognition for the design of its offices and edit bays. Architect Ray Kappe, a founder of the Southern California Institute of Architecture (SCI-Arc), designed the Venice, California facility’s edit bays. Artist and designer Roy McMakin designed furniture and interiors for the Venice offices. Dan Wood of WORK AC designed Spot Welders’ New York offices, which opened in 2005.

References

Film production companies of the United States